Shikaripura Harihareshwara (1936 – 23 July 2010) was a Kannada writer. He served as the chief editor of 'Amerikannada', a bimonthly magazine in Kannada. In 1999, he was among the recipients of the Rajyothsava award constituted by Government of Karnataka. He was widely known for the literary work he did residing in United States of America.

Works
 'Darshana'
  Hariharēśvara, Es. Ke. Kannaḍa Uḷisi Beḷasuva Bage: "Amerikannaḍa"da Cintanegaḷu. Maisūru: Saṃvahana, 2005. Print. 'US Library of Congress permalink'

External links
 'NRI Kannadigas not Refugees'
 Obituary on OurKarnataka.com
 Obituary by writer Srivathsa Joshi
 Obituary by OneIndia
 Obituary by OneIndia 2
 Wikipedia page on Shikaripura Harihareshwara in Kannada language :kn:ಶಿಕಾರಿಪುರ ಹರಿಹರೇಶ್ವರ

Kannada-language writers
Writers from Mysore
People from Shimoga
Kannada people
1936 births
2010 deaths